The 2018–19 Akron Zips men's basketball team represented the University of Akron during the 2018–19 NCAA Division I men's basketball season. The Zips, led by second-year head coach John Groce, played their home games at the James A. Rhodes Arena as members of the East Division of the Mid-American Conference. They finished the season 17–16, 8–10 in MAC play to finish in fourth place in the East Division. They defeated Miami (OH) in the first round of the MAC tournament before losing in the quarterfinals to Buffalo.

Previous season
The Zips finished the 2017–18 season 14–18, 6–12 in MAC play to finish in last place in the East Division. In the MAC tournament, they defeated Western Michigan in the first round before losing to Eastern Michigan in the quarterfinals.

Offseason

Departures

Incoming Transfers

Recruiting class of 2018
There was no recruiting class for Akron in 2018.

Recruiting class of 2019

Roster

Schedule and results

|-
!colspan=9 style=| Non-conference regular season

|-
!colspan=9 style=| MAC regular season

|-
!colspan=9 style=| MAC tournament

Source

References

Akron Zips men's basketball seasons
Akron